Etel Sánchez (born 23 August 1989) is an Argentine synchronized swimmer.

Etel competed in the women's duet at the 2012 Summer Olympics with her twin sister Sofía and finished in 22nd place.  They were the first Argentine pair to compete in the duet at the Olympics. She also competed at the 2016 Summer Olympics with her sister and finished in 19th place.  She and Sofia were born as a set of triplets with their brother Thomas who plays volleyball.

Career records
Solo
 2010, South American Games, 3rd

Duet
 2010, South American Games, 3rd
 2011, Pan American Games, 6th

Duet technical routine
 2013, World Aquatics Championships, 15th

Team
 2010, South American Games, 3rd
 2011, Pan American Games, 6th

References 

1989 births
Living people
Argentine synchronized swimmers
Olympic synchronized swimmers of Argentina
Synchronized swimmers at the 2012 Summer Olympics
Synchronized swimmers at the 2016 Summer Olympics
Synchronized swimmers at the 2015 Pan American Games
Synchronized swimmers at the 2015 World Aquatics Championships
Synchronized swimmers at the 2013 World Aquatics Championships
Synchronized swimmers at the 2011 World Aquatics Championships
Synchronized swimmers at the 2009 World Aquatics Championships
Twin sportspeople
Synchronized swimmers at the 2011 Pan American Games
Triplets
Sportspeople from Rosario, Santa Fe
South American Games bronze medalists for Argentina
South American Games medalists in synchronized swimming
Competitors at the 2010 South American Games
Pan American Games competitors for Argentina